Golden Sword (foaled 26 April 2006) is a British-bred Thoroughbred racehorse. He won the Chester Vase in 2009, before finishing fifth in The Derby and second in the Irish Derby. He was trained by Aidan O'Brien until the summer of 2010, when was transferred to Mike de Kock after being purchased by Sheikh Mohd bin Khalifa Al Maktoum.

References

2006 racehorse births
Racehorses bred in the United Kingdom
Racehorses trained in Ireland
Racehorses trained in South Africa
Thoroughbred family 21-a